The Sprint 95 is a French sailboat that was designed by Joubert Nivelt Design as a racer-cruiser and first built in 1989. The boat's nomenclature indicates its approximate metric length overall in decimetres.

Production
The design was built by Archambault Boats of Dangé-Saint-Romain, France, with 90 boats completed between 1989 and 1997, but it is now out of production.

Design
The Sprint 95 is a recreational keelboat, built predominantly of fibreglass. It has a fractional sloop rig with aluminum spars. The hull has a raked stem, a walk-through reverse transom, an internally mounted spade-type rudder controlled by a tiller and a fixed fin keel or optional shoal draft keel. It displaces  and carries  of ballast.

See also
List of sailing boat types

References

External links
Video: Sprint 95
Video: Sailing a Sprint 95

Keelboats
1980s sailboat type designs
Sailing yachts
Sailboat type designs by Joubert-Nivelt
Sailboat types built by Archambault Boats